is a Japanese actor and representative director of AIC RIGHTS. He got his start in acting portraying Keigo Atobe in Musical: The Prince of Tennis: The Imperial Presence, Hyotei as part of the Hyoutei B Cast. In 2009, he portrayed the lead role in Kamen Rider Decade, Tsukasa Kadoya, who had the ability to transform into the title character and in the music videos for Gackt's "Journey Through the Decade" and "Stay the Ride Alive" as the series' main character. He later appears in the Garo series Garo: Goldstorm Sho. In January 2023, he was appointed as the representative director of AIC RIGHTS.

Filmography

Television

Films

References

External links
Official agency profile 
Official blog 

1989 births
People from Yokohama
Living people
Japanese male actors
Kamen Rider